Zabieliai Palace is a former residential palace in Kaunas Old Town, at the corner of T.Daugirdo street and Kaunas Town Hall square. Currently it is occupied by restaurant "Medžiotojų užeiga" (English: "Hunters dry").

References

Palaces in Kaunas
Baroque palaces in Lithuania